Vakhnevo is a rural locality (a village) and the administrative center of Vakhnevskoye Rural Settlement, Nikolsky District, Vologda Oblast, Russia. The population was 175 as of 2002.

Geography 
Vakhnevo is located 37 km northwest of Nikolsk (the district's administrative centre) by road. Turino is the nearest rural locality.

References 

Rural localities in Nikolsky District, Vologda Oblast